Arcadia refers to a vision of pastoralism and harmony with nature. The term is derived from the Greek province of the same name which dates to antiquity; the province's mountainous topography and sparse population of pastoralists later caused the word Arcadia to develop into a poetic byword for an idyllic vision of unspoiled wilderness. Arcadia is a poetic term associated with bountiful natural splendor and harmony. The 'Garden' is often inhabited by shepherds. The concept also figures in Renaissance mythology.  Although commonly thought of as being in line with Utopian ideals, Arcadia differs from that tradition in that it is more often specifically regarded as unattainable.  Furthermore, it is seen as a lost, Edenic form of life, contrasting to the progressive nature of Utopian desires.

The inhabitants were often regarded as having continued to live after the manner of the Golden Age, without the pride and avarice that corrupted other regions. It is also sometimes referred to in English poetry as Arcady. The inhabitants of this region bear an obvious connection to the figure of the noble savage, both being regarded as living close to nature, uncorrupted by civilization, and virtuous.

In antiquity 
According to Greek mythology, Arcadia of Peloponnesus was the domain of Pan, a virgin wilderness home to the god of the forest and his court of dryads, nymphs and other spirits of nature. It was one version of paradise, though only in the sense of being the abode of supernatural entities, not an afterlife for deceased mortals.

In the 3rd century BCE the Greek poet Theocritus wrote idealised views of the lives of peasants in Arcadia for his fellow educated inhabitants of the squalid and disease-ridden city of Alexandria.

Greek mythology inspired the Roman poet Virgil to write his Eclogues, a series of poems set in Arcadia.

In the Renaissance 
Arcadia has remained a popular artistic subject since antiquity, both in visual arts and literature. Images of beautiful nymphs frolicking in lush forests have been a frequent source of inspiration for painters and sculptors. Because of the influence of Virgil in medieval European literature, e. g. in Divine Comedy, Arcadia became a symbol of pastoral simplicity. European Renaissance writers (for instance, the Spanish poet Garcilaso de la Vega) often revisited the theme, and the name came to apply to any idyllic location or paradise. Unlike "utopia", which Saint Thomas More innovated by authoring his book Utopia, "Arcadia" connotes not a human civilization, yet rather a spontaneous result of life lived naturally and thus not corrupted by civilization. 

Of particular note is Et in Arcadia Ego by Nicolas Poussin, which has become famous both in its own right and because of its (possible) connection with the gnostic histories or the Rosicrucians. In 1502 Jacopo Sannazaro published his long poem Arcadia that fixed the Early Modern perception of Arcadia as a lost world of idyllic bliss, remembered in regretful dirges. 

In the 1580s Sir Philip Sidney circulated copies of his influential heroic romance poem The Countess of Pembroke's Arcadia, which established Arcadia as an icon of the Renaissance; although the story is plentifully supplied with shepherds and other pastoral characters, the primary characters are all royal visitors of the countryside. In 1598 the Spanish playwright and poet Lope de Vega published Arcadia: Prose and Verse, which was a bestseller at the time.

Though depicted as contemporary, this pastoral form is often connected with the Golden Age. It may be suggested that its inhabitants have merely continued to live as persons did in the Golden Age, and all other nations have less pleasant lives because they have allowed themselves to depart from original simplicity.

Acadia 
The 16th-century Italian explorer Giovanni da Verrazzano applied the name "Arcadia" to the entire North American Atlantic coast north of Virginia. In time, this mutated to Acadia. The Dictionary of Canadian Biography says: "Arcadia, the name Verrazzano gave to Maryland or Virginia 'on account of the beauty of the trees', made its first cartographical appearance in the 1548 Gastaldo map and is the only name on that map to survive in Canadian usage. . . . In the 17th century Champlain fixed its present orthography, with the 'r' omitted, and Ganong has shown its gradual progress northwards, in a succession of maps, to its resting place in the Atlantic Provinces".

Revival of Mi'kmaq language has provided strong reason to believe that Verrazzano was informed by the name the Mi'kmaq gave to this place. The name Acadie may be derived from the Mi'kmaq, because in their language the word “cadie” means "place of abundance” and can be found in names such as “Tracadie” and “Shubenacadie”.

19th century

Arcadia has been a popular setting for artists of the 19th and 20th centuries. 

In 1848, Judge Samuel Treat, of St. Louis described life of the early settlers in the Midwest with the sentence "Each family produced whatever was necessary  for  its own consumption, and lived in almost Arcadian simplicity."

Composer W. S. Gilbert used the concept of Arcadia in his musicals Happy Arcadia (1872) and Iolanthe (1882).

Around 1880, the German painter Wilhelm von Kaulbach produced an etching, named "Faust und Helena in Arkadien". Faust and Helena are shown in the Arcadian grove, at the place of cheerful poetry, where they produced a son, Euphorion. He represent the spirit of antiquity married to the Nordic-German spirit, as an allegory of German-Greek poetry.

The American painter Thomas Eakins produced a series of Arcadian works in the 1880´s: His painting "In Arcadia", which was an "unusual venture into mythology, tackled using the most modern of methods: the camera"  and a relief with nearly 20 sculptures, paintings and phothographs connected with it. The atmosphere of the relief has been described as "vespertinal mixture of sadness and tranquility", a "sylvan realm far removed from the realities in 1883 Philadelphia". New York magazine critic Mark Stevens wrote "His [Eakins] joy in the natural body rarely made its way into his major paintings, perhaps because the subject was so personally complex for him. Only in his great "Swimming", which shows naked young men at a swimming hole, did he create an American Arcadia."
Easkins student Thomas Pollock Anshutz (1851-1912) had a long preoccupation painting "Arcadian subjects".

20th century

One of the most popular Edwardian musical comedies is The Arcadians (1909). 

In 1945, Evelyn Waugh sub-titled the first part of his novel Brideshead Revisited "Et in Arcadia ego". 

In Gabriel García Márquez's 1967 novel One Hundred Years of Solitude, the founder and patriarch of the Macondo community bears the name José Arcadio Buendía. Over the course of the novel, Arcadio becomes a multigenerational patronym that resonates with many of the other utopian tropes explored elsewhere in the text. 

In the anime series Captain Harlock, the ship in which he travels is known as the Arcadia. He calls it the place "to fight and live for our freedom [and dreams]".

In the 1985 novel Blood Meridian by Cormac McCarthy, the character of Judge Holden names his rifle "Et in Arcadia ego". 

The 1985 Arcadia (band) were a spin-off musical group formed by three members of the band Duran Duran. 

In 1988, experimental / industrial / post punk / psychedelic art and music collective Psychic TV released the song "Just Like Arcadia."

In 1993, Tom Stoppard wrote Arcadia (originally to have been titled Et in Arcadia ego), a play involving themes of classical beauty and order in nature.

See also 
 Arcadia (region of Greece)
 Acadia
 Golden Age
 Locus amoenus
 Millennialism
 Et in Arcadia ego (Guercino), painting by Italian artist Giovanni Francesco Barbieri
 Utopia
 Neverland
 Pastoral
 Olam Haba
 Otherworld
 Garden of Eden

Notes

References

External links 

Net in Arcadia Virtual Museum of Contemporary Classicism

Greek mythology
Mythical utopias
Mythological kingdoms, empires, and countries
Renaissance art
Conceptions of heaven
Utopia
Visual motifs